"The Operation" is the 18th episode of third season of the British BBC anthology TV series Play for Today. The episode was a television play that was originally broadcast on 26 February 1973. "The Operation" was written by Roger Smith, directed by Roy Battersby, produced by Kenith Trodd, and starred George Lazenby. The episode is about an asset stripper trying to buy up a row of houses.

Plot
David Alder, a British property magnate educated in Australia, wants to develop a real estate site in his old home town of Snelgrove that involves knocking down an old building.

At a dinner in Snelgrove, he meets a couple, Ted and Diane Hardin. David dances with Diane. He then contacts an old friend he has not seen in two years, George Timmins, and explains he has been seeing Diane. David says Diane wants to meet some of his friends, and George is the only one David has. Although George has been unemployed for years, David tells Diane that George is a successful screenwriter.

David and George attend a party at Ted and Diane's house which winds up as a key party. George stays the night and discovers Ted is a grocer.

David, George and Diane go on holiday together at David's holiday house. David buys Diane some lingerie then leaves to go back to the city. Diane and George spend the night together platonically.

Ted visits David at the latter's office and says he wants advice. A property developer wants Ted to get out of the business but Ted is reluctant as his family has been there for forty years. Ted asks David for advice how to fight it and David admits his company is the developer. David advises him to take the offer saying the building will fall down in a few years and that Ted can have a lease in the new building.

David invites a councillor over to his house to persuade him to compulsorily acquire Ted's lease. The councillor is reluctant but David plies him with drink and arranges for a woman to perform oral sex on the man, which David has photographed.

David invites Diane to move in with him. Diane writes Ted a letter saying he is leaving. In a rage, Ted sets fire to some items.

David offers George a job and the latter agrees; he offers Diane anything she wants and she asks for plastic surgery.

The building is knocked down. David reveals he will make a million pounds on the deal. When a drunken George asks David if money is the answer to all things, David says "yes".

David dresses up in a uniform and engages in bondage with Diane. Ted stumbles in and shoots David and Diane to death.

George turns to the camera and says what happened next: Ted goes to Broadmoor Prison. The share price of the company drops but picks up when it is announced business will continue. The Sunday Times pays twelve thousand points for the rights to the story. A new building is built on the site.

The end caption reads “any similarity to characters living or dead is merely evidence of our times”.

Cast
 George Lazenby as David Alder
 Tom Kempinski as George Timmins
 Maurice Roëves as Ted Hardin
 Maureen Shaw as Diane Hardin
 John Ralpey as Chief Rotarian
 Patsy Smart as cleaner

Reception
The TV critic for The Times called it a "tedious affair":

The Spectator called it:

Controversy
The play led to the BBC being criticised by its advisory council for its use of bad language, and depiction of sextortion and wife swapping.

References

External links
 
 The Operation at Letterbox DVD
 "The Operation" at TV Cream
 "The Operation" at BFI

1973 British television episodes
1973 television plays
British television plays
Play for Today